The 2009 Paris–Nice, the 67th running of the race, started on 8 March in Amilly, and concluded on 15 March in Nice. It was won by Luis León Sánchez.

Favorites to win included Alberto Contador, who won in 2007, Cadel Evans, and Fränk Schleck. The 2008 winner, Davide Rebellin, did not take part in the event.  The race was the second event in the inaugural UCI World Ranking.

Stages

Stage 1 – March 8, 2009: Amilly, 9.3 km (ITT)

Stage 2 – March 9, 2009: Saint-Brisson-sur-Loire > La Chapelle-Saint-Ursin, 195.5 km

Stage 3 – March 10, 2009: Orval > Vichy, 178 km

Stage 4 – March 11, 2009: Vichy > Saint-Étienne, 173.5 km

Stage 5 – March 12, 2009: Annonay > Vallon-Pont-d'Arc, 204 km

Stage 6 – March 13, 2009: Saint-Paul-Trois-Châteaux > La Montagne de Lure, 182.5 km

Stage 7 – March 14, 2009: Manosque > Fayence, 191 km

Stage 8 – March 15, 2009: Nice > Nice, 119 km

Final standings

Team Classification

Jersey progress

Jersey wearers when one rider is leading two or more competitions
 Bradley Wiggins wore the green jersey in Stage 2
 Heinrich Haussler wore the green jersey in Stage 4

Withdrawals

Teams and cyclists
The following 20 UCI ProTour and UCI Professional Continental teams were selected to the 2009 Paris–Nice:

References

External links
 
 cyclingnews

Paris–Nice
Paris-Nice
Paris-Nice
Paris-Nice